Thomas Ho Siu-hung is a British actor, of Chinese descent.

Selected filmography
 Die Another Day (2002) - Korean Guard (uncredited)
 Little Britain (1 episode, 2003) - Gay Partygoer (uncredited)
 Footballers' Wives (1 episode, 2004) - Masseur (uncredited)
 Hustle as a gambling chef (1 episode, 2004) - Chef (uncredited)
 Doctors as Tony Cheung (1 episode, 2005) - Tony Cheung (uncredited)
 The Pink Panther (2010) - Chinese Footballer (uncredited)
 The Blood Bond (2010) - Chang

References

https://www.imdb.com/name/nm1173734/
http://www.movietome.com/people/251343/thomas-ho/index.html

External links

1973 births
Living people
English male film actors
English male stage actors
English male television actors
English male voice actors
Hong Kong emigrants to England
People from Kowloon